What follows is a list of all British National Quartet Champions since their first contest in 1974.

Winners and any quartets that score 76% or over are eligible to be invited to compete in the BHS International Quartet Contest.

Champions by year

See also 
British Association of Barbershop Singers

References 

British Association of Barbershop Singers
Barbershop music
BABS quartet champions